The 2022 Copa Ecuador (officially known as the Copa Ecuador Ecuabet 2022 for sponsorship purposes) was the second edition of the Copa Ecuador, Ecuador's domestic football cup. It began on 6 May 2022 and ended with the single-legged final on 8 November 2022.

Independiente del Valle won their first title in the competition, defeating 9 de Octubre in the final by a 3–1 score. LDU Quito were the defending champions, having won the previous edition of the competition in 2019, but were knocked out by Imbabura in the round of 16.

Format 
The competition involved 48 teams and was divided into six rounds. The first round was played by the 10 Serie B teams, the 20 provincial association champions, and the amateur champion and runner-up teams, which were drawn into 16 double-legged ties. The 16 winners advanced to the round of 32, where they were drawn against the 16 Serie A teams in single-legged ties with the lower-tier side hosting the match.

The round of 16 and the quarter-finals were also played as single-legged ties by the winners of the preceding rounds, whilst the four quarter-final winners played a semi-final group stage with each team playing the others in the group twice. The top two teams in the semi-final group advanced to the final.

Prizes 
The champions of this edition qualified for the 2023 Supercopa Ecuador and would also earn the right to compete in the 2023 Copa Libertadores, taking the Ecuador 4 berth in that competition. In case the champions qualified for the Copa Libertadores through their league or international performance, the berth would be transferred to the runners-up, the semi-finalists (provided they were Serie A teams for the following season), or the next best team in the Ecuadorian Serie A not yet qualified for that competition.

Schedule

Teams 
48 clubs took part in this edition of the Copa Ecuador: 16 from the Serie A, 10 from the Serie B, 20 from the Segunda Categoría, and 2 amateur teams.

Serie A

 9 de Octubre
 Aucas
 Barcelona
 Cumbayá
 Delfín
 Deportivo Cuenca
 Emelec
 Gualaceo
 Guayaquil City
 Independiente del Valle
 LDU Quito
 Macará
 Mushuc Runa
 Orense
 Técnico Universitario
 Universidad Católica

Serie B

 América de Quito
 Atlético Santo Domingo
 Búhos ULVR
 Chacaritas
 El Nacional
 Imbabura
 Independiente Juniors
 Libertad
 Manta
 Olmedo

Segunda Categoría

 Aampetra
 Atlético Samborondón
 Bonita Banana
 Danubio
 Deportivo Santo Domingo
 Dunamis 04
 Estudiantes
 Independiente Azogues
 Insutec
 La Unión
 Leones del Norte
 Orellanense
 Peñarol
 Portoviejo
 Primero de Mayo
 Santa Elena Sumpa
 Unibolívar
 Unión Manabita
 Universitario
 Vargas Torres

Amateur teams

 7 de Febrero
 Quito

First round
Teams entering this round: 10 teams from Serie B, 20 teams from Segunda Categoría, and 2 amateur teams.

|}
Notes

Round of 32
Teams entering this round: 16 teams from Serie A. The team from the lower tier hosted the match.

Round of 16

Quarter-finals

Semi-final

Final

Top scorers
{| class="wikitable" border="1"
|-
! Rank
! Name
! Club
! Goals
|-
| align=center | 1
|  Gabriel Cortez
| 9 de Octubre
| align=center | 6
|-
| rowspan=4 align=center | 2
|  Jaime Ortiz
| Leones del Norte
| rowspan=4 align=center | 4
|-
|  Jhonnier Chalá
| El Nacional
|-
|  Jonathan Bauman
| Independiente del Valle
|-
|  Santiago Giordana
| Mushuc Runa
|-
| rowspan=3 align=center | 6
|  Walberto Caicedo
| 9 de Octubre
| rowspan=3 align=center | 3
|-
|  Lautaro Díaz
| Independiente del Valle
|-
|  Leandro Pantoja
| Imbabura
|}

Source: FEF

See also
2022 Ecuadorian Serie A
2022 Ecuadorian Serie B
2022 Segunda Categoría

References

External links
Copa Ecuador 2022 – Ecuadorian Football Federation 

Ecuador
C